Hemanth may refer to:

Hemanth (singer), Indian playback singer
Hemanth M. Rao, Indian film director
Hemanth Menon (born 1989), Indian actor
Hemanth Ravan, Indian actor

See also
Hemant, an Indian male given name, including a list of people with the name
Hemanta (disambiguation), a variation of the name Hemant, including a list of people with the name
Hemantha, a Sinhalese male given name, including a list of people with the name